The common seadragon or weedy seadragon (Phyllopteryx taeniolatus) is a marine fish related to the seahorses. Adult common seadragons are a reddish colour, with yellow and purple markings; they have small leaf-like appendages that resemble kelp fronds providing camouflage and a number of short spines for protection. Males have narrower bodies and are darker than females. Seadragons have a long dorsal fin along the back and small pectoral fins on either side of the neck, which provide balance. Common seadragons can reach  in length.

The common seadragon is the marine emblem of the Australian state of Victoria.

Range
The common seadragon is endemic to Australian waters of the Eastern Indian Ocean, Southern Ocean and the South Western Pacific Ocean. It can be found approximately between Port Stephens (New South Wales) and Geraldton, Western Australia, as well as Tasmania.

Habitat
It is associated with rocky reefs, seaweed beds, seagrass meadows and structures colonised by seaweed.

Biology
These fish are slow-moving and rely on their camouflage as protection against predation; they drift in the water and with the leaf-like appendages resemble the swaying seaweed of their habitat. They lack a prehensile tail that enables similar species to clasp and anchor themselves.

Individuals are observed either on their own or in pairs; feeding on tiny crustaceans and other zooplankton by sucking prey into their toothless mouths. As with seahorses, seadragon males are the sex that cares for the developing eggs. Females lay around 120 eggs onto the brood patch located on the underside of the males' tail. The eggs are fertilised and carried by the male for around a month before the hatchlings emerge. The young are independent at birth, beginning to eat shortly after. Common seadragons take about 28 months to reach sexual maturity, and may live for up to six years.

Mating in captivity is relatively rare since researchers have yet to understand what biological or environmental factors trigger them to reproduce. The survival rate for young common seadragons is low in the wild, but it is about 60% in captivity.

The Aquarium of the Pacific in Long Beach, California and the Tennessee Aquarium in Chattanooga, Tennessee in the US, and the Melbourne Aquarium in Melbourne, Australia are among the few facilities in the world to have successfully bred common seadragons in captivity, though others occasionally report egg laying. In March 2012 the Georgia Aquarium in Atlanta, USA, announced a successful breeding event of common seadragons. As of July 2012, the Monterey Bay Aquarium has also successfully bred and hatched out baby common seadragons on exhibit.

Threats
The common seadragon is classified as Least Concern (LC) on the IUCN Red List 2017 . While the common seadragon is a desired species in the international aquarium trade, the volume of wild-caught individuals is small and therefore not currently a major threat. Instead, habitat loss and degradation due to human activities and pollution threaten common seadragons most.

The loss of suitable seagrass beds and loss of canopy seaweed from inshore rock reefs, coupled with natural history traits that make them poor dispersers, put the future of seadragon populations at risk. This species is not at present a victim of bycatch or a target of trade in traditional Chinese medicine, two activities which are currently a threat to many related seahorse and pipefish populations.

Conservation

It is illegal to take or export these species in most of the states within which they occur. A database of seadragon sightings, known as 'Dragon Search' has been established with support from the Marine Life Society of South Australia Inc., ('Dragon Search' arose as the logical progression of a similar project initiated by the MLSSA, which was the first community group or indeed organisation of any type to adopt the common seadragon's close relative, the leafy seadragon, as part of its logo), the Marine and Coastal Community Network (MCCN), the Threatened Species Network (TSN) and the Australian Marine Conservation Society (AMCS), which encourages divers to report sightings. Monitoring of populations may provide indications of local water quality and seadragons could also become an important 'flagship' species for the often-overlooked richness of the unique flora and fauna of Australia's south coast. 

Captive breeding programs are in place for the weedy seadragon, headed up by Sea Life Melbourne Aquarium. The dragon has been difficult to breed in captivity, though in 2015 research observing the creatures in the wild and trying to replicate the conditions in captivity had researchers making changes to the light, water temperature and water flow proving to be key.

In December 2015 the Melbourne aquarium hatched eggs and the aquarium's weedy seadragon population significantly increased. The aquarium reported in March 2016 that 45 fry were still going strong—a 95% survival rate.

Related species
The common seadragon is in the subfamily Syngnathinae, which contains all pipefish. It is most closely related to the other member of its genus, the ruby seadragon (Phyllopteryx dewysea), and also the leafy seadragon (Phycodurus eques). Haliichthys taeniophorus, sometimes referred to as the "ribboned seadragon" is not closely related (it does not form a true monophyletic clade with weedy and leafy seadragons).

The common seadragon was previously the only member of its genus until the description of the ruby seadragon in 2015.

Ongoing research
In the November 2006 issue of National Geographic magazine, marine biologist Greg Rouse is reported as investigating the DNA variation of the two seadragon species across their ranges.

References

External links
 Common Seadragon video on Youtube

 Australian Museum Online - Leafy and Weedy Seadragons
 Leafy Seadragons and Weedy Seadragons
 Weedy Sea Dragon Monitoring Program in Botany Bay
 Leafy Sea Dragon Festival
 Weedy Sea Dragon
 Youtube Male Weedy Seadragon with eggs
 Youtube Weedy Seadragon
 Male Weedy Sea Dragon carrying eggs
 BBC Weedy seadragon videos, news and facts
 Fishes of Australia : Phyllopteryx taeniolatus

.

common seadragon
Marine fish of Southern Australia
common seadragon
Articles containing video clips